X Factor is the Albanian television reality music competition, based on the original British series, and an addition to The X Factor franchise, to find new singing talent. The show began airing on 8 January 2012 and was broadcast by TV Klan. 

The judging panel consisted of Pandi Laço, Alban Skënderaj, Juliana Pasha, Vesa Luma, Altuna Sejdiu, Soni Malaj, Miriam Cani and Bleona Qereti. The show is hosted by Alketa Vejsiu. She applied to acquire the rights of the show along with Top Channel and TV Klan. Syco TV gave the rights to her, then she sold parts of the rights to TV Klan. After losing the rights of The X Factor, Top Channel acquired the rights of the talent show, The Voice.

The show run for 4 seasons, with the last episode airing on 1 June 2015, and then TV Klan announced that there were no plans to air another series of the programme. On 6 June 2022, Alketa Vejsiu announced that after 7 years, the show would return, with his fifth season on 2023 on TV Klan.

There have been four winners: Sheila Haxhiraj, Arilena Ara, Ergi Dini and Edea Demaliaj	.

Overview
It was announced that there would be four categories on the show, Males 15 to 23, Females 15 to 23, over 23s and The Groups.

Also it was announced that there would be five stages of the competition. The first stage is known as the  "Producers audition", the producers of the show choose which of the contestants will have the right to audition in front of the judges. Next the contestants audition in front of the judges where they sing at least one song with instrumentals or A Capella. The third stage of the competition is Bootcamp, where from thousands of contestants only 150 are left. The fourth stage includes the "Judge's houses" or known in Albania as "Vilat e Jurive", where only 32 contestants,8 per category would fight for their place in the live shows. And the last stage of the competition would be the Live shows, where four contestants per category will make it.

In the first live show the public couldn't vote or make a decision. In the second live show and on, only the public had the right to vote and decide which contestants from all categories would end up in the bottom two. The two contestants with the lowest number of votes would end up in the bottom two, then they sing again for survival, the four judges would decide which contestant they want to eliminate. If one of the judges has his or her contestant on the bottom two, he or she usually decides to eliminate the other contestant in the bottom two, so the real decision is in the hands of the two or (if one judge has two of its contestants in the bottom two) three judges that don't have their own contestants in the bottom two. The show goes this way on the live shows every week one or two contestants are voted off, until the grand finale on June 10 when the winner is announced.

The auditions were held in different cities across Albania and Kosovo, the producers auditions included many cities but the auditions in front of the judges were held only in a few. The cities that auditions were held with the judges are Tirana, Vlora, Elbasan, Shkoder and the Kosovan capital Pristina. The first episode aired half of Tirana's auditions on January 8. Vesa Luma wasn't the judge on all of the city auditions, she was chosen as the fourth judge only after all of the city auditions ended. She judged on the Shkodra's audition also. It was reported that more than 7000 people auditioned for the show, which broke a record for the biggest number of auditions in any talent show across Albania, Kosovo and the Balkans.

On the official Facebook page of the X Factor, it was announced that the show would be first aired on January 8, 2012. It was reported that the winner of the show would be signed to the famous label Syco Music, which has signed the likes of Leona Lewis, One Direction, Susan Boyle, Little Mix, Cher Lloyd, Alexandra Burke, Westlife etc. The winner of the first season of X factor Albania was Sheila Haxhiraj.

Judges and hosts

Series summary
 Contestant in "Pandi Laço"
 Contestant in "Juliana Pasha"
 Contestant in "Alban Skënderaj"
 Contestant in "Vesa Luma" 
 Contestant in "Altuna Sejdiu"
 Contestant in "Soni Malaj"
 Contestant in "Miriam Cani"
 Contestant in "Bleona Qereti"

Judges' categories and their contestants
In each season, each judge is allocated a category to mentor and chooses four acts to progress to the live shows. This table shows, for each season, which category each judge was allocated and which acts he or she put through to the live shows.

Key:
 – Winning judge/category. Winners are in bold, eliminated contestants in small font.

References 

 
Television series by Fremantle (company)
2012 Albanian television series debuts
2015 Albanian television series endings
2010s Albanian television series
Albanian reality television series
Non-British television series based on British television series
Television shows filmed in Albania
Television shows set in Albania
Televizioni Klan original programming